Dinamo-Samara is a futsal club based in Samara, Russia. It was founded in 2018. Today Dinamo-Samara is competing in the Russian Super League.

Current squad

Achievements
 Russian Futsal Super League
 Third place: 2018/2019

League results

Head coaches
 Maksim Gorbunov (2018–2021)
 Stanislav Larionov (2021)
 Konstantin Tymoshchenkov (2022)

See also 
 MFK Dinamo Moskva

References

External links
 Dinamo-Samara

Sport in Samara, Russia
Futsal clubs in Russia
Futsal clubs established in 2018
2018 establishments in Russia